Metabolic panel may refer to:

 Blood test
 Basic metabolic panel
 Comprehensive metabolic panel